Sawiris is the Arabic/Coptic equivalent for the Latin/Roman name Severus.

Sawiris  may refer to:
 Sawiris family
 Onsi Sawiris, founder of Orascom Group
 Naguib Sawiris, Egyptian businessman, CEO of Orascom Telecom
 Nassef Sawiris, Egyptian businessman, CEO of Orascom Construction Industries
 Samih Sawiris, Egyptian businessman, CEO of Orascom Development
 Sawiris Foundation for Social Development, a charity run by Sawiris Family